Tirlyansky (Tirlän), also known as Tirlyan, Tirlian and Bashkir Tirlan, is a village in the Beloretsky District of Bashkortostan, the center and the only settlement of the Tirlyansk soviet.
It is located at the confluence of the Tirlian River and the Belaya River 33 km from Beloretsk. The nearest railway station is 41km away.

Plans began in 1759 for an iron works in the village but it was not till 1803 that the plant began operations. A full road was only constructed to the town in 1913, built by Chinese workers. The railway was built soon after.

After the construction of an asphalt road in 2001 between Tirlyan and Beloretsk, the movement of passenger trains Beloretsk-Tirlian-Beloretsk was closed since 20 May 2002. By autumn 2003, a section of a narrow-gauge railway between Tirlyan and Verkhnearshinsky was dismantled. As of the end of 2003, the narrow-gauge line from Beloretsk to Tirlyan remained alive. On it was an irregular movement - mainly the export of rolling stock from Tirlyan to scrap metal. Periodically, from Beloretsk to Tirlian, fuel oil for the boiler room was also delivered. These last 34 kilometers were once the most important section of the Beloretsk railway, where hundreds of passengers drove daily. The last section of the Beloretsk narrow-gauge railway (from Beloretsk to Katayki) was dismantled in the spring and summer of 2007.

In 1994 the village was affected by terrible floods.

Landmarks

In Tirliansky, despite the small size of the village, there are a lot of attractions:
The main one is the ruins of the Iron plant. The plant was closed after the 1994 flood.

Near the ruins of the plant is a huge iron wheel with spokes. This is one of two drivers  for the rolling mills.
There is still a hollow in the rocks, where the Beloretskaya narrow-gauge railway line (BUW) ran, through which opens a beautiful view of the reservoir opens up.

Population

References

Rural localities in Beloretsky District